Sha'arei Shalom ("Gates of Peace"), also known as North Manchester Reform Congregation, is a Reform Jewish congregation formed in 1977 and affiliated to the Movement for Reform Judaism. Since 1980 it has met at Elms Street, Whitefield, in the Metropolitan Borough of Bury, Greater Manchester, England.

See also
 List of Jewish communities in the United Kingdom
 List of former synagogues in the United Kingdom
 Movement for Reform Judaism

References

External links
 Official website
 The Movement for Reform Judaism
 Sha'arei Shalom: North Manchester Reform Congregation on Jewish Communities and Records – UK (hosted by jewishgen.org)

1977 establishments in England
Buildings and structures in the Metropolitan Borough of Bury
Jewish organizations established in 1977
Reform synagogues in the United Kingdom
Religion in Greater Manchester
Whitefield, Greater Manchester